The Conservation Council of Western Australia is the umbrella body for conservation groups and organisations in Western Australia.  It has been the co-ordinator, publisher and guiding body for issues of woodchipping in the South West of Western Australia, the logging of old growth forests, as well as providing input into government processes involved with all aspects of environmental protection and conservation.

Its origins were closely related to the Perth-based - Environment Centre of W.A., and the development and success of the environmental movement also saw subsequent development of the regional environment centres in Denmark, Albany, Margaret River and Busselton.

In 1981 the council was involved in a class action in the United States against bauxite miners Reynolds and Alcoa. regarding mining in the jarrah forests of the Darling Range east of Perth; the complaint was lodged with the U.S. Federal District Court in Pittsburgh, Pennsylvania. 

Notable member groups of the council have included the Campaign to Save Native Forests, South West Forests Defence Foundation, West Australian Forest Alliance, and Great Walk Networking. Smaller, more transient single-purpose protest groups have found the council a positive custodian and advocate over the thirty years of its activities.  Some groups are no longer current but their impact on the process of conservation and preservation in Western Australia have been significant in raising public awareness of issues.

Affiliated groups
(This list may not be correct - some groups might be inactive - and other active groups may be not listed...) 
(In alphabetical order...)

Active Community Environmentalists
Albany Community Environment Centre Inc
Alumina Action Alliance
Animal Rights Advocates
Australian Association of Bush Regenerators (WA)
Australian Marine Conservation Society 
Avon Valley Environmental Society
Balingup Friends of the Forest Inc.
Bassendean Preservation Group Inc
Birds Australia WA Group
Blackwood Environment Society
Bridgetown-Greenbushes Friends of the Forest
Bushwalkers of WA
Busselton-Dunsborough Environment Centre
Canning River Residents Environment Protection Association
Cape Conservation Group
Cape to Cape Alliance
Care for Hedland Environmental Association
Coogee Coastal Action Coalition
Darling Range Wildlife Shelter
Denmark Conservation Society
Denmark Environment Centre
EARTH
Environmental Defenders Office WA
Environment House
Environmental Weeds Action Network (WA)
Environs Kimberley 
FAWNA Inc.
Foothills Save Our Trees Action Group
Friends of Bold Park Bushland Inc.
Friends of Moore River Estuary
Friends of the Fitzgerald River National Park
Friends of Star Swamp Bushland Inc
Geographic Society of WA Inc.
Guilderton Community Association
Lake Meelup Preservation Society
Leeuwin Environment
Leighton Action Coalition
Local Environmental Action Forum (LEAF)
Malleefowl Preservation Group
Margaret River Regional Environment Centre
Men of the Trees
Naragebup Rockingham Regional Environment Centre 
Nature and Agriculture Rehabilitation Association (NARA)
Nature Reserves Preservation Group
Oxfam (WA Branch)
Peel Preservation Group
People for Nuclear Disarmament
Perth Bushwalkers Club
Pilbara Wildlife Carers Association
Pollution Action Network
Port Kennedy LCDC
Quinns Rocks Environmental Group Inc
Roleystone Dieback Action Group
Save Endangered East Kimberley Species Group Inc.
Save Our Marine Life
South West Environment Centre
South-West Forest Defence Foundation Inc.
Sustainable Energy Now, Inc.
Sustainable Population Australia Inc. WA Branch
Sustainable Transport Coalition
The River Conservation Society
The Rottnest Society
Urban Bushland Council (WA)
Vive La Recherche
WA Native Orchid Study & Conservation Group
WA Speleological Group (WASG)
Walpole-Nornalup National Park Association
Waterbird Conservation Group Inc.
Western Australian Naturalists' Club
Wetlands Conservation Society
Wilderness Society WA
Wildflower Society of WA 
Yamatji Land and Sea Council
Yarloop and Districts Concerned Residents Committee
Youth Environment Scheme

Community incentive
The council created the Bessie Rischbieth Conservation Award to acknowledge the contribution of a volunteer in the community conservation sector in 1994.

See also
Conservation Council of South Australia
Environment Victoria
Queensland Conservation Council
Woodchipping

Notes 
a:.Jarrah class action legal complaint: the Conservation Council of Western Australia Inc. (Plaintiffs) - v. - Aluminium Company of America (ALCOA) and Reynolds Metals Co., (Defendants), Feb. 1981.  [Perth, W.A.] : Conservation Council of W.A, 1981. 

b:.Conservation Council, Etc. v. Aluminum Co., Etc. 518 F. Supp. 270 (W.D. Pa. 1981). Casetext, 9 July 1981. Retrieved 19 October 2022.

References

 Elston, Kylie, (1993) The origins of the Conservation Council in Western Australia 1955-1967  Murdoch University theses. History, Honours 
 The Environment Centre of W.A. (1996)  Community resource guide : a guide to information, speakers, and resources on environmental, social justice and other community issues Perth, W.A. The Centre. "Produced with financial assistance from the Gordon Reid Foundation"
 The Environment Centre of W.A. (2001) Community resource guide, 2001 : a guide to information, speakers, and resources on environmental, social justice and other community issues . Perth W.A.: The Centre.
 McGrath, Clare B. (1984) Directory of conservation and environment groups in Western Australia  assisted by the W.A. Department of Conservation and Environment. Perth, W.A. Conservation Council of W.A..  
 Monk, Ian D  (2000) A history of the Conservation Council of Western Australia 1967-1977  Murdoch University theses.  Master of Arts in Public History

Further reading
 The Greener times : official publication of the Conservation Council of Western Australia (Inc.).  Perth, W.A : The Council, 1990-
 Forest information resource kit : an introduction to some key issues in the forest debate in Western Australia  Conservation Council of WA with - WA Forest Alliance, and  Wilderness Society (WA) Perth, W.A.: The Council, 1999.
 Rundle, Graeme. The Perth Environment Centre : its beginnings. Greener times, Feb. 1998, p. 12-13,

External links
 http://www.ccwa.org.au/
 http://www.saveourmarinelife.org.au/

Nature conservation in Western Australia
Nature conservation organisations based in Australia
Organisations based in Western Australia